The Gulfstream Park Turf Sprint Stakes is a Grade III American Thoroughbred horse race for horses four-year-olds and older at the distance of five furlongs on the turf held annually in February at Gulfstream Park, Hallandale Beach, Florida.  The event currently carries a purse of $125,000.

History 
The event was inaugurated 23 January 2011 and was won by the eight-year-old former claimer Stradivinsky who was the 11/10 favorite in a 5 horse field in a time of 56.69.

In 2020 the event was renamed to the World of Trouble Turf Sprint Stakes after the sprinter World of Trouble who won the race the previous year.

The event was upgraded to Grade III in 2021 and the name of the race was reverted to the Gulfstream Park Turf Sprint Stakes.

Records
Speed record: 
 5 furlongs:  54.17 –  Varsity (2013)

Margins: 
  lengths –  Yes I Am Free (2022)

Most wins
 2 – Power Alert (AUS)  (2016, 2017)
 2 – Yes I Am Free 	(2022, 2023)

Most wins by a jockey
 3 – Julien R. Leparoux   (2011, 2016, 2017)

Most wins by a trainer
 2 – Brian A. Lynch   (2016, 2017)
 2 – Laura Cazares (2022, 2023)

Most wins by an owner 
 2 – AJ Suited Racing Stable & Brian A. Lynch  (2016, 2017)
 2 – Michael Dubb  & Bethlehem Stables (2011, 2019)
 2 – Golden Kernel Racing Stable (2022, 2023)

Winners

See also
List of American and Canadian Graded races

External links
 2020–21 Gulfstream Park Media Guide

References 

Turf races in the United States
Recurring sporting events established in 2011
Horse races in the United States
Graded stakes races in the United States
2011 establishments in Florida
Horse races in Florida
Grade 3 stakes races in the United States
Hallandale Beach, Florida